Clarence "Herb" Robertson (born February 21, 1951) is a jazz trumpeter and flugelhornist. He was born in New Jersey and attended the Berklee School of Music. He has recorded solo albums and has worked as a sideman for Tim Berne, Anthony Davis, Bill Frisell, George Gruntz, Paul Motian, Bobby Previte, and David Sanborn.

Discography

As leader 
 Transparency (JMT, 1985)
 X-Cerpts: Live at Willisau (JMT, 1987)
 Shades of Bud Powell (JMT, 1988)
 Certified (JMT, 1991)
 Falling in Flat Space (Cadence Jazz, 1996) with Dominic Duval and Jay Rosen - 
 Sound Implosion with Dominic Duval and Jay Rosen (CIMP, 1997)
 Rituals with Phil Haynes (CIMP, 2000)	
 Brooklyn-Berlin with Phil Hayens (CIMP, 2000)
 Knudstock 2000 (Cadence, 2000)		        
 Music for Long Attention Spans (Leo, 2001) 
 The Legend of the Missing Link (Septet & Quintet) (Splasc(h), 2001)
 Elaboration (Clean Feed, 2005)
 Sketches from the Other Side, For A.I. (Ruby Flower, 2006)
 Parallelisms with Evan Parker & Agustí Fernandez (Ruby Flower, 2007)
 Real Aberration (Clean Feed, 2007)
 Celebrations with Frank Gratkowski, Simon Nabatov, Dieter Manderscheid  (Leo, 2007)
 Live at Alchemia (Not Two, 2007) with Marcin Oles & Bartlomiej Oles 
 Passing the Torch with Jean-Luc Cappozzo (Ruby Flower, 2008)
 Diablo en musica - Improvisations with Rich Messbauer and Tom Sayek (Out/In Space, 2008)

As sideman 
With Ray Anderson
Big Band Record (Gramavision, 1994) with the George Gruntz Concert Jazz Band
With Tim Berne
 The Ancestors (Soul Note, 1983)
 Sanctified Dreams (Columbia, 1987)
 Tim Berne's Fractured Fairy Tales (JMT, 1989)
 Pace Yourself (JMT, 1991)
 Diminutive Mysteries (Mostly Hemphill) (JMT, 1993)
 Nice View (JMT, 1994)
 Open, Coma (Screwgun, 2001)

With Marc Ducret
 News from the Front (JMT, 1992)

With Mark Helias
 Split Image (Enja, 1984)
 The Current Set (Enja, 1987)
 Desert Blue (Enja, 1989)
 Attack the Future (Enja, 1992)

With Andy Laster
 Twirler (Sound Aspects, 1990)
 Hydra (Sound Aspects, 1994)
 Polyogue (Songlines, 1995)
 Soft Shell (Knitting Factory, 2000; recorded 1998)

With Satoko Fujii Orchestra New York
 South Wind (Leo/Libra, 1997)
 The Future of the Past (Enja, 2001)
 Blueprint (MTC, 2003)
 Undulation (PJL, 2005)
 Summer Suite (Libra, 2007)
 Eto (Libra, 2010)

With others 
 Stefan Winter - The Little Trumpet (JMT, 1986)
 Michael Moore Quintet – Home Game (Ramboy, 1992; recorded 1988)
 Lindsey Horner – Never No More (Open Minds, 1991; recorded 1989)
 The New York Composers Orchestra - Music by Marty Ehrlich, Robin Holcomb, Wayne Horvitz, Doug Wieselman (New World, 1990)
 Bobby Previte – Music of the Moscow Circus (Gramavision, 1991)
 Roberto Zorzi with Tim Berne, Bobby Previte, Mark Feldman, Herb Robertson, Matteo Ederle, Percy Jones - The Bang (Nueva, 1991; reissued as Bang! by ICTUS, 2011)
 Marc Ducret - News from the Front (JMT, 1992)
 Lesli Dalaba - Core Samples (EarRational, 1992)
 Anthony Davis - X, The Life and Times of Malcolm X, An Opera in Three Acts (Gramavision, 1992)
 Klaus König - The Song of Songs (Enja, 1992)
 Sybille Pomorin / Terry Jenoure - Auguries of Speed (ITM, 1995)
 Paul Lytton Quartet - The Balance of Trade (CIMP, 1996)
 Lou Grassi's PoBand - Mo' Po (CIMP, 1997)
 Joe Fonda - From the Source (Konnex, 1997)
 Barry Guy New Orchestra - Inscape–Tableaux (Intakt, 2001)
 Jay Rosen Trio - Drums 'n Bugles (CIMP, 2001)
 Dominic Duval with Herb Robertson, Bob Hovey, Jay Rosen - Asylem (Leo, 2001)
 Joe Lovano – Viva Caruso (Blue Note, 2002)
 The Fonda / Stevens Group - Twelve Improvisations (Leo, 2004; recorded 2002)
 Mokuto (with Lotte Anker) - Dressed Like a Horse (Ninth World, 2007; recorded 2003)
 Gerry Hemingway Quartet – The Whimbler (Clean Feed, 2004)
 Lou Grassi Quartet - Avanti Galoppi (CIMP, 2004)
 Lou Grassi's PoBand - Infinite Potential (CIMP, 2005)
 Barry Guy New Orchestra - Oort–Entropy (Intakt, 2005)
 Stefan Winter - Der Kastanienball / The Chestnut Ball - The Fall of Lucrezia Borgia, "audio film" (Winter & Winter, 2005)
 Pierre Dørge & New Jungle Orchestra - Negra Tigra (ILK, 2005)
 Alípio C. Neto Quartet – The Perfume Comes Before the Flower (Clean Feed, 2008)
 Barry Guy London Jazz Composers Orchestra - Harmos - Live in Schaffhausen (Intakt DVD, 2012; recorded 2008)
 100nka & Herb Robertson – Superdesert (Not Two, 2009)
 Barry Guy and the London Jazz Composers' Orchestra with Irène Schweizer – Radio Rondo/Schaffhausen Concert (Intakt, 2009)

References

External links 
Herb Robertson's homepage (discontinued since 2005) Retrieved November 3, 2012
Extensive interview with Joe Milazzo from September 2002 on One Final Note Retrieved November 3, 2012

Berklee College of Music alumni
American jazz trumpeters
American male trumpeters
People from New Jersey
1951 births
Living people
CIMP artists
21st-century trumpeters
21st-century American male musicians
American male jazz musicians
Ilk Records artists
Clean Feed Records artists
JMT Records artists